In architecture, a baseboard (also called skirting board, skirting, wainscoting, mopboard, trim, floor molding, or base molding) is usually wooden or vinyl board covering the lowest part of an interior wall.  Its purpose is to cover the joint between the wall surface and the floor. It covers the uneven edge of flooring next to the wall; protects the wall from kicks, abrasion, and furniture; and can serve as a decorative molding.

At its simplest, baseboard consists of a simple plank nailed, screwed or glued to the wall; however, particularly in older houses, it can be made up of a number of moldings for decoration. A baseboard differs from a wainscot; a wainscot typically covers from the floor to around 1-1.5 m high (waist or chest height), whereas a baseboard is typically under 0.2 m high (ankle height).

Plastic baseboard comes in various plastic compounds, the most common of which is UPVC. It is usually available in white or a flexible version in several colors and is usually glued to the wall. Vinyl baseboard is glued with adhesive and can be difficult to remove or to replace. It has a long lifespan, which can mean lower maintenance. 

Wooden baseboard can be available in untreated, lacquered or prepainted versions. Prepainted baseboards can be made from a single piece or finger jointed wood, often softwoods, while  hardwoods are either lacquered, or raw for staining and made from a single piece of wood.

Heaters are sometimes installed in place of or in front of baseboards. These come in  electrical and radiator varieties, the latter relying on hot water as their heat source.

See also

 Quarter round
 Crown molding
 Dado
 Dado rail
 Panelling

References

Woodworking
Floors
Residential heating
Architectural elements